Alexander Elliott (born April 24, 1987) is a Canadian former soccer player. Elliott retired from playing in 2012 and entered the coaching world of soccer. Elliott is a UEFA A Licensed Coach.

Career

Youth
Born in Vancouver, British Columbia, Elliott attended Summerland Secondary School and Magee Secondary School in Vancouver, and played for Columbus FC of the Vancouver Men's league (VMSL) in 2004 Elliott earned the league's golden boot with 12 goals in 16 matches at the age of 16. In 2006 Elliott played in the Pacific Coast Soccer League for Whitecaps FC Reserves with whom he won the championship. Elliott then went on to play three years of college NCAA soccer at the University of Portland. He was named to the WCC All-Freshman Team and started all 19 matches in his first season with the Pilots in 2005, earned All-West Coast Conference Team honours as a sophomore in 2006, and went on to earn All-West Coast Conference First Team honours in 2007, adding WCC points, assist, and game-winning goals leader. Elliott Finished a 3-year NCAA Career with 21 goals and 10 Assists, a point per game average over 52 matches. Elliott occasionally captioned the U15, U17 and U20 Team Canada squads throughout his youth.

Professional
Elliott opted out of the MLS draft and turned professional in 2008 when he signed with Sportfreunde Siegen of the German Bundesliga 3, making seven appearances, With 3 assists. At the summer break of 2008, Elliott was sold to FSV Mainz 05 of the German Bundesliga 1. He played extensively for Mainz's reserves, making 23 appearances and scoring two goals while adding 6 assists.

Elliott returned to Canada in the summer of 2010 when he joined the Vancouver Whitecaps Appearing in 14 of the final 16 matches in the 2010 season.

Elliott then returned to the German Bundesliga to play for former club SportFreunde Siegen Sportfreunde Siegen from 2010 to 2012 scoring 7 goals in 34 matches. Elliott retired from playing in 2012.

International
Elliott has represented Canada at U-15, U-17, U-20 and Men's futsal team levels. He scored two goals in eight matches with the U-17 squad and was a member of the U-17 group that competed in the 2003 CONCACAF Qualifying Tournament. Later he was a member of the U-20 squad that competed in the 2007 FIFA U-20 World Cup, Scoring 13 goals in 27 Friendly matches over his two years with the U-20 team, Acting as team Co-Capitan. In 2008 Elliott was not released by SF Siegen to join the U23 Canadian Team at Olympic Qualifying. In 2012 Elliott joined the Canadian national futsal team at the 2012 CONCACAF futsal world cup qualifiers in Guatemala. Elliott was the team's top goalscorer with 4 goals in the CONCACAF futsal world cup qualifiers. Elliott retired from playing directly after the tournament.

References

 
 soccerblogs topten Alex Elliott
 Ex-Canada U20 Elliott signs with Vancouver Whitecaps

External links playing career
 Act-Sports Groups: Alex Elliott
 Elliott's Caps debut will be a friends family affair
 
 DFB Alex Elliott
 Mainz05 Interview With Alex Elliott
 Vancouver Whitecaps bio
 Footballread Alex Elliott 2007 highlights
 Alex Elliott BC Head of the class 2005
 Alex Elliott 2003-2004 VMSL Golden Boot winner
 2007 University of Portland Soccer Stats
 All-Time university of Portland Men's Soccer Stats

External links coaching career
 Alex Elliott named head coach of CapU Blues men's soccer
 Family, Trust, Responsibility, Faith, and Pride
 Kermodes head to gold medal match
 Meet Coach Elliott
 Quest Men's Soccer Makes History
 Kermodes find silver lining in PACWEST champs
 Turnaround Season Ends With A Medal
 Elliott Named Quest University Head Coach
 Quest Men Snap Streak
 Quest Kermodes ready for provincial debut
 Quest Kermodes capture first ever men's soccer medal
 Fusion FC Staff
 The 2016-17 Quest Men's Soccer team ended their season on a high note
 Elliott is optimistic about many of the recent developments at Quest.

1987 births
Living people
Canadian soccer players
Canadian expatriate soccer players
1. FSV Mainz 05 players
Soccer players from Vancouver
Sportfreunde Siegen players
Vancouver Whitecaps (1986–2010) players
Association football forwards
Portland Pilots men's soccer players
University of Portland alumni
USSF Division 2 Professional League players
Canada men's youth international soccer players
1. FSV Mainz 05 II players
Canadian men's futsal players